Andreas Volden Evensen (born 19 February 1986) is a Norwegian professional boxer whose last 4 bouts have been on Sauerland Events Viasat Nordic Fight Night cards.

Evensen was born in Bogotá, Colombia. His trainer is Helge Wærøy.

In December 2010 in a title fight against Ricky Burns (in WBO's super-featherweight division), he lost by points, and in February, 2013, he was stopped in the final round while challenging for Alexander Miskirtchian's European title.

Professional boxing record

| style="text-align:center;" colspan="8"|17 Wins (6 knockouts, 11 decisions),  3 Losses (1 knockout, 2 decisions), 1 Draw
|-  style="text-align:center; background:#e3e3e3;"
|  style="border-style:none none solid solid; "|Res.
|  style="border-style:none none solid solid; "|Record
|  style="border-style:none none solid solid; "|Opponent
|  style="border-style:none none solid solid; "|Type
|  style="border-style:none none solid solid; "|Rd., Time
|  style="border-style:none none solid solid; "|Date
|  style="border-style:none none solid solid; "|Location
|  style="border-style:none none solid solid; "|Notes
|- align=center
|Loss
|align=center|17-3-1||align=left| Alexander Miskirtchian
|
|
|
|align=left|
|align=left|
|- align=center
|Win
|align=center|17-2-1||align=left| Philippe Frenois
|
|
|
|align=left|
|align=left|
|- align=center
|Win
|align=center|16-2-1||align=left| Willie Casey
|
|
|
|align=left|
|align=left|
|- align=center
|Win
|align=center|15-2-1||align=left| Julio Buitrago
|
|
|
|align=left|
|align=left|
|- align=center
|Draw
|align=center|14-2-1||align=left| Sergio Prado
|
|
|
|align=left|
|align=left|
|- align=center
|Win
|align=center|14-2||align=left| Yordan Vasilev
|
|
|
|align=left|
|align=left|
|- align=center
|Loss
|align=center|13-2||align=left| Ricky Burns
|
|
|
|align=left|
|align=left|
|- align=center
|Win
|align=center|13-1||align=left| Jose Saez
|
|
|
|align=left|
|align=left|
|- align=center
|Win
|align=center|12-1||align=left| Payak Patanakan Gym
|
|
|
|align=left|
|align=left|
|- align=center
|Win
|align=center|11-1||align=left| Mihaly Telekfi
|
|
|
|align=left|
|align=left|
|- align=center
|Win
|align=center|10-1||align=left| Gianpiero Contestabile
|
|
|
|align=left|
|align=left|
|- align=center
|Win
|align=center|9-1||align=left| Andrey Kostin
|
|
|
|align=left|
|align=left|
|- align=center
|Win
|align=center|8-1||align=left| Rikard Lundby
|
|
|
|align=left|
|align=left|
|- align=center
|Win
|align=center|7-1||align=left| Alex Bone
|
|
|
|align=left|
|align=left|
|- align=center
|Loss
|align=center|6-1||align=left| Benoit Gaudet
|
|
|
|align=left|
|align=left|
|- align=center
|Win
|align=center|6-0||align=left| Artak Alijan
|
|
|
|align=left|
|align=left|
|- align=center
|Win
|align=center|5-0||align=left| Pascal Bouchez
|
|
|
|align=left|
|align=left|
|- align=center
|Win
|align=center|4-0||align=left| Younes Amrani
|
|
|
|align=left|
|align=left|
|- align=center
|Win
|align=center|3-0||align=left| Miloud Saadi
|
|
|
|align=left|
|align=left|
|- align=center
|Win
|align=center|2-0||align=left| Stefan Berza
|
|
|
|align=left|
|align=left|
|- align=center
|Win
|align=center|1-0||align=left| Piotr Niesporek
|
|
|
|align=left|
|align=left|
|- align=center

References

1986 births
Living people
Colombian emigrants to Norway
Norwegian male boxers
Featherweight boxers
Sportspeople from Bogotá